Demme is a surname. Notable people with the surname include:

Diego Demme (born 1991), German footballer
Jonathan Demme (1944–2017), American film director, producer and screenwriter
Rudolf Demme (1894–1975), German Wehrmacht general
Ted Demme (1963–2002), American film director and producer